Euseius coccineae is a species of mite in the family Phytoseiidae.

References

coccineae
Articles created by Qbugbot
Animals described in 1975